Ivor Barry Lloyd (born 1950) is a retired rower who competed for Great Britain.

Rowing career
Lloyd was part of the quad scull that finished 7th overall after winning the B final at the 1977 World Rowing Championships in Amsterdam.

Administration
He was the Managing Director of Dorney Lake 2005 until 2016  and since 1985 has had an association with the Leander Club in various roles as Captain, Director of Rowing and Chairman.

References

1950 births
Living people
English male rowers
British male rowers